"Redlight" is a song released by American DJ and producer Ian Carey.

Track listing
CD single
 Redlight (Radio edit)
 Redlight (Bingoplayers remix)
 Redlight (Franky Rizardo remix)
 Redlight (Original Mix)

Charts

References

2008 singles
Ian Carey songs
2008 songs
Songs written by Alexander Perls